Binti, is a 2021 Tanzanian drama film directed by Seko Shamte and co-produced by director herself with Alinda Ruhinda and Angela Ruhinda. The film stars Bertha Robert, Magdalena Munisi, Helen Hartmann and Godliver Gordian in the lead roles whereas Yann Sow, Alex Temu and Jonas Mugabe made supportive roles. The film revolves around four contemporary women characters in Dar es Salaam in four chapters: Tumaini, Angel, Stella and Rose.

The film has been shot in and around Dar es Salaam, Tanzania. The color correction was done in India and Los Angeles, and the sound was done in Egypt. The screening was delayed two years due to COVID-19 pandemic. The film premiered on 8 March 2021 at the Pan African Film Festival for the International Women's Day. The film received mixed reviews from critics and screened in many film festivals.

Cast
 Bertha Robert as Tumaini
 Magdalena Munisi as Angel
 Helen Hartmann as Stella
 Godliver Gordian as Rose
 Yann Sow as Emma
 Alex Temu as Ben
 Jonas Mugabe as James
 Hadija Athumani Saidi as Young Tumaini
 Hasham H. Hasham as Jeweler
 Jaffari Makatu as Young Baba Tumaini
 Levison Kulwa James as The Twins
 James Doto James as The Twins
 Betty Kazimbaya as Mama Tumaini
 Akbar Thabiti as Nelson
 Tiko Hassan as Tamala
 Tamala S. Kateka as Get Away Driver
 Francis Mpunga as Older Baba Tumaini
 Anatoly Shmakor as European Policeman
 Suleiman Mchora as Policeman
 Neema Wlele as Catherine
 Angel Henry George as Alinda
 Jane Masha as Doris
 Yasser Msellem as Omari
 Sauda Simba Kilumanga as Mama Angel
 Rita Paulsen as Doctor Ruhinda
 Hailath Maiko as Stella's Assistant
 Patricia David as Waitress
 Kyan Ishau as Chris
 Ruqahya Ramadhani as Irene
 Abubakar Amri as Rose's Assistant
 Chiku Seif as Fatima
 Regina Kihwewle as School Teacher
 Izack Lukindo as Doctor Shamte
 Abdallah Minyuma as Computer Technician
 Kiswiju Mpyanga as Mama Rose

References

External links 
 

Tanzanian drama films
2021 films
2021 drama films
Swahili-language films
2020s English-language films